Nascus is a genus of Neotropical butterflies in the family Hesperiidae, in which it is placed to tribe Phocidini.

References

Natural History Museum Lepidoptera genus database

External links
 Images representing Nascus at Consortium for the Barcode of Life

Eudaminae
Hesperiidae of South America
Hesperiidae genera
Taxa named by Edward Yerbury Watson